Toulminville is a neighborhood of Mobile, Alabama, United States. It began as a small settlement on the property of Harry Theophilus Toulmin, who served as Sheriff of Mobile County in the 1830s. During the American Civil War, Toulminville was mapped along the Mobile and Ohio Railroad as a significant settlement, northwest of Mobile (see map).  In 1945, the remainder of Toulminville was annexed into the city of Mobile. The area of Toulminville has varied over the past decades from being an upper-middle class suburb to having a serious crime problem during most of the 1980s and 1990s, although the trend has been reversed in recent years.

Annexation by Mobile
Toulminville remained a largely rural settlement until after the Civil War, when it slowly took on the character of a suburb to Mobile. It remained largely exurban in character until the 20th century, when growth within the city of Mobile spilled over into Toulminville. Part of Toulminville was annexed into the city of Mobile in the 1920s, and the whole of Toulminville was annexed into the city of Mobile in 1945, in the annexation which tripled the size of Mobile's corporate limits. By World War II, Toulminville had become an upper-middle class suburb, with many affluent neighborhoods built along Stanton and Summerville streets.

Professional baseball player Hank Aaron grew up in Toulminville as a young boy.

White flight
Suburbanization started after World War II, as highways were built and new houses were built outside the city. Middle and upper-class whites began to move out of the city to newer housing, especially after desegregation following civil rights advances of the 1960s. A perceived upsurge of crime on Mobile's north side contributed to this white migration. (In 1966 a white nun was raped by a black man in a notorious incident at Catholic Cemetery on Stone Street, now Martin Luther King Avenue.) The district was majority white in 1960 and became nearly 80% black by 1975. Toulminville was the heart of the district that elected John LeFlore to the Mobile County Commission; he was a Mobile NAACP leader and the first African American elected to the county commission.

Upper-class neighborhoods along Stanton and Summerville streets retained their white population for some time. In the 1980s they became majority black and retained high property values. While Stanton and Summerville are middle-class areas, most of Toulminville is lower-class. During most of the 1980s and 1990s with its economic and drug problems, this area had a serious crime problem. That trend has reversed due to a concerted effort by the Mobile Police Department and community leaders in Toulminville.

Toulminville was the birthplace of United States Surgeon General William Crawford Gorgas, who worked to control yellow fever and malaria during World War I. Several streets and an elementary school were named after him. Figures Park, named for Senator Michael Figures, an influential African-American politician of the 20th century, was originally named Gorgas Park, in honor of the general. This neighborhood was the adolescent home of baseball legend Hank Aaron.

Education
Toulminville is within the Mobile County Public School System. Washington Middle School is in Toulminville.

LeFlore Magnet High School (originally Toulminville High School) is a performing arts magnet school named in honor of John L. LeFlore. Toulminville High School was renamed LeFlore High School in honor of LeFlore. In the 1980s, it was converted into a magnet school, which under Mobile County Public School policy to increase diversity, is ideally to have a 50/50 black white mix. The county is majority white and the school has a 75/25 black-white mix.

References

Neighborhoods in Mobile, Alabama
Populated places established in the 1860s